Decap may refer to:

Decapsulation machinery, a type of Sample preparation equipment
Decapitation
Decapping